Fore is an EP by the punk rock band Pegboy. It was released in 1993 on Quarterstick Records.

Track listing

Personnel
Pegboy
Larry Damore – Vocals
Joe Haggerty – drums
John Haggerty – guitar
Production and additional personnel
Steve Albini – bass guitar, production, engineering
Paul Kozal – photography

References

External links 
 

1993 EPs
Albums produced by Steve Albini
Quarterstick Records EPs
Pegboy albums